Miami Station may refer to:
Miami station (Amtrak), the current Amtrak station on the outskirts of Miami, Florida
Miami Intermodal Center, an intermodal station near Miami International Airport in Miami, Florida, serving Metrorail, Tri-Rail, and the MIA Mover
MiamiCentral, a station in downtown Miami, Florida, serving Brightline, and also Metrorail and Metromover at the directly connected Government Center station
Miami Station, Missouri, an unincorporated community in Missouri
Miami Railway Station, a former railway station in Miami, Manitoba, now a railway museum and National Historic Site of Canada